Ian Thomson (born 15 January 1963) is an Australian cricket umpire. Thomson serves as a member of the ICC Associate and Affiliate Panel of Umpires representing Hong Kong.

He stood in his first One Day International (ODI) match on 8 November 2016, between Hong Kong and Papua New Guinea.

See also
 List of One Day International cricket umpires

References

External links
 

1963 births
Living people
Australian cricket umpires
Hong Kong cricket umpires
Hong Kong One Day International cricket umpires
Sportspeople from Sydney